Carex micropoda is a species of sedge found in temperate and boreal regions of the Northern Hemisphere.

Description

Taxonomy
Carex micropoda was first described by Carl Anton von Meyer in 1831. It is very similar to, and possibly synonymous with, a number of other published taxa.

References

micropoda
Flora of temperate Asia
Flora of North America
Plants described in 1831